Wolvercot Platform was a halt on the Great Western Railway line between Oxford and Banbury. The line is now known as the Cherwell Valley Line or the "Oxford Canal Line".

History 

The platform was opened on 1 February 1908; it was situated on the north side of Godstow Road, and served the village of Wolvercote, but was spelt Wolvercot to try to reduce confusion with the nearby Wolvercote Halt on the London and North Western Railway's Varsity Line. Although only a halt, Wolvercot had once been staffed and during the First World War it became the first station to have a stationmistress.

The GWR closed Wolvercot Platform on 1 January 1916. Wolvercot Siding signalbox, a 29-lever hipped roof structure which survived the closure, controlled the level crossing over Godstow Road as well as vehicular access to the adjacent meadows. The down starter in Wolvercot Siding carried the distant arms for Wolvercot Junction,  to the north, where the Oxford, Worcester and Wolverhampton Line diverged north-westwards from the Birmingham Main Line.

Route

Notes

References

Disused railway stations in Oxfordshire
Railway stations in Great Britain opened in 1908
Railway stations in Great Britain closed in 1916
Former Great Western Railway stations
1908 establishments in England